Sir Thomas Dalyell of The Binns, 1st Baronet (1615–1685) was a Scottish Royalist general in the Wars of the Three Kingdoms, also known by the soubriquets "Bluidy Tam" and "The Muscovite De'il".

Life

Dalyell was born in Linlithgowshire, the son of Thomas Dalyell of The Binns, head of a cadet branch of the family of the Earls of Carnwath, and of Janet, daughter of the 1st Lord Bruce of Kinloss, Master of the Rolls in England.

He appears to have accompanied Charles I's expedition to La Rochelle in 1628 (to aid the Huguenots during the Siege of La Rochelle) at the age of thirteen. Latterly as a colonel, he served under General Robert Munro and General Alexander Leslie in Ulster.

Hearing of the execution of Charles I on 30 January 1649, it is said that he refused to shave his beard as a penance for the behaviour of his fellow countrymen. He was taken prisoner at the capitulation of Carrickfergus in August 1650, but was given a free pass, and having been banished from Scotland, remained in Ireland.

He was present at the Battle of Worcester (3 September 1651), where his men surrendered, and he himself was captured and imprisoned in the Tower of London. In May he escaped abroad and, in 1654, took part in the Highland rebellion and was exempted from Cromwell's Act of Grace, a reward of 200 guineas being offered for his capture, dead or alive.

Dalyell evaded capture and fled to Russia. There, he entered the service of Tsar Alexis I and distinguished himself as general in the wars against the Turks and Tatars as well as in the Russo-Polish War (1654–1667).

He returned to Britain upon The Restoration of Charles II. By 19 July 1666 he was appointed commander-in-chief in Scotland, with orders to subdue the Covenanters. Dalyell defeated them at the Battle of Rullion Green, in the Pentland Hills, south of Edinburgh. He treated the defeated with great cruelty, earning him the nickname "Bluidy Tam". Legends of his cruelty were probably exaggerated by anti-Royalists. The General obtained several of the forfeited estates of his opponents.

On 3 January 1667 he was made a privy counsellor, and from 1678 till his death he represented Linlithgowshire in the Scottish parliament. He was incensed by the choice of the Duke of Monmouth as commander-in-chief in June 1679, and was confirmed in his original appointment by Charles, but in consequence did not appear at the Battle of Bothwell Brig till after the close of the engagement.

On 25 November 1681, a commission was issued authorizing him to enroll the regiment afterwards known as the Scots Greys. His commission was confirmed by King James VII, but he died soon after the latter's accession in August 1685. He married Agnes, daughter of John Ker of Cavers, by whom he had a son, Thomas, created a baronet in 1685, whose only son and heir, Thomas, died unmarried. The baronetage apparently became extinct, but it was assumed about 1726 by James Menteith. The Dalyell baronetage was later held by politician Tam Dalyell, formally styled Sir Thomas Dalyell of the Binns, 11th Baronet.

Gaming with the devil
Legend has it that "Bluidy Tam" enjoyed on occasion a hand of cards with the devil. During one of these games, the devil, losing, threw the card table at the general. The devil missed and the table flew threw through the window and ended up in a pond on the grounds of the House of the Binns. This tale was passed down through generations of inhabitants of the Binns. In 1870, following a particularly hard drought, a marble topped card table was seen poking through the low waters of the pond. In 1930 the mother of the twentieth century Tam Dalyell asked a local joiner to repair the legs on the table, to find out that the about-to-be-retired tradesman's first job had been to retrieve said table from the pond.

Bibliography
Report on the Muniments of Sir Robert Osborne Dalyell, baronet of Binns, Hist. MSS. Comm. 9th Rep. pt. ii. 230–8
Captain Creighton's Memoirs in Swift's Works
Thurloe State Papers, ii.
State Papers, Dom. Ser., 1654–67
Wodrow's Sufferings of the Church of Scotland
Fountainhall's Historical Notices: ib. Observes
Nicolls's Diary
Burnet's Own Time
Balfour's Annals
Acts of the Parliament of Scotland
Douglas's Baronage of Scotland
Grainger's Biog. Hist. of England, 4th ed. iii. 380–1
Letters to the Duke of Lauderdale, 1666–80
British Library Add MSS 23125–23126; 23128; 23135; 23246–23247, published in Lauderdale Papers (Camden Society)
Letters to Charles II, Add. MS. 28747
information from Sir Robert Dalyell, K.C.I.E.
Foster's Members of Parliament in Scotland, 1882

References

Sources

Attribution

1615 births
1685 deaths
17th-century Scottish people
Cavaliers
Shire Commissioners to the Parliament of Scotland
Members of the Privy Council of Scotland
People from West Lothian
Russian people of the Russo-Polish War (1654–1667)
Prisoners in the Tower of London
Royal Scots Greys officers
Scottish generals
Baronets in the Baronetage of Nova Scotia